The Ford Institute for Human Security was established in 2003, and is an independent research institute located within the University of Pittsburgh. The researchers at the institute primarily investigate issues relating to human rights, including: genocide, forced labor, corporate responsibility, international conflicts, forced migration, refugees, and environmental security. The institute generates and disseminates policy papers and advances nonpartisan policy proposals. Research produced by the Ford Institute is available to national and international policy makers, non-governmental organizations, corporations and any interested organizations. Each year the institute hosts several conferences, speakers, and workshops on issues related to human security. The Ford Institute was created with a large endowment from Ford Motor Company, and is currently under the direction of Taylor B. Seybolt, a professor at the Graduate School of Public & International Affairs (GSPIA). The Ford Institute was previously directed by professors Simon F. Reich, who founded the institute in 2003, Paul J. Nelson, and Taylor B. Seybolt.

Research groups
Research at the Ford Institute is broken into several project groups, each with a particular focus. Each project is directed by a University of Pittsburgh faculty member, and consists of policy analysts and researchers within the respective field. Each project group develops policy papers and findings reports based on research results. Currently, the project groups are as follows:
Genocide
Slave and Forced Labor
Corporate Social Responsibility
Intrastate Conflict and Human Rights
Internal Displacement, Forced Migration, and Refugees
Environmental Security and Public Health

Affiliates
The  (France) 
International Peace Research Institute of Oslo (Norway) 
The RISE Institute (Washington D.C. & Columbia)
Graduate School of Public and International Affairs 
University Center for International Studies

External links
Ford Institute for Human Security
University of Pittsburgh
University of Pittsburgh Graduate School of Public and International Affairs
Matthew B. Ridgway Center for International Security Studies

University of Pittsburgh
2003 establishments in Pennsylvania